Alongkorn Wannarot is a Thai air force officer.  he serves as commander-in-chief of the Royal Thai Air Force. He previously served as assistant air force commander.

References 

Living people
Place of birth missing (living people)
Alongkorn Wannarot
Year of birth missing (living people)
Alongkorn Wannarot